KD-88 (Kongdi-88) is a standoff land attack missile built by China Aerospace Science and Technology Corporation (CASC). Its export version is called TL-17. It can be launched from a fighter aircraft or a bomber. Although comparable in size, configuration and capabilities, the KD-88 is not a true member of YJ-8 family.

Operators

People's Liberation Army Air Force
People's Liberation Army Navy

References

Guided missiles of the People's Republic of China
Anti-ship cruise missiles of the People's Republic of China